Prof. (Dr) B. Madhusoodana Kurup, an internationally renowned fisheries researcher, academician, visionary and administrator, is the Founder Vice-Chancellor of Kerala University of Fisheries and Ocean Studies (KUFOS), Cochin and also served as the third Vice Chancellor of Shri Venkateshwara University, Gajraula, Uttar Pradesh. He has established and successfully developed the first Fisheries and Ocean Sciences University in the country. He did his postdoc from Fish Culture and Fisheries division, Wageningen University & Research, The Netherlands. He served as UGC Professor (Fisheries) at Cochin University of Science and Technology (CUSAT) for over eighteen years.

He has more than 38 years of teaching and 40 years of research experience. He was also the Scientific Advisor to the Minister for Fisheries, Government of Kerala; and Director, School of Industrial Fisheries. He worked as Fishery Expert in Indo-Dutch Cooperation Programme-Kuttanad Water Balance Study Project - (NL), Inland Fishery Expert - Ashtamudi Management Plan - New Zealand, Fishery Consultant: India Eco-development Project, World Bank, Aquaculture Expert - NZAID Cage culture. He was awarded Aquagris - EU 6th Framework 2007, Marie Curie Fellowship of European Union, Nuffic MHO of NL, NUFFIC South-South programme, Indo-Vietnam Cooperation, Pandit Karuppan Award - 2016, Abdul Kalam Gold Medal Award instituted by Global Economic Prospects and Research Association and Dr. S. Jones Centenary Award - 2010 of Marine Biological Association of India, for his outstanding research contributions in Marine Biology and Fisheries.

He has visited more than 15 overseas universities and research institutions as Visiting Fellow and visiting professor. He has completed 22 Research Projects with funding support from several national and international funding organisations. He has successfully guided 25 Ph.D. and 12 M.Phil. students and published more than 250 research papers in peer reviewed journals.

Professor Kurup is a lead academician served as a member of the academic council, board of studies, examiner of various universities. He also served as subja etc. expert in the Agricultural Service Recruitment Board (ICAR-ASRB) in the selection of Deputy Director General (DDG), Assistant Director General (DDG), Institute Directors, Principal Scientists for the ICAR institutions.

Currently he serves as chairman, Scientific Advisory Committee, Rajiv Gandhi Centre for Aquaculture (RGCA), MPEDA-Ministry of Commerce & Industry, Government of India, chairman, Research Advisory Committee, ICAR-Central Institute of Brackish water Aquaculture, Chennai and Adjunct Faculty, Cochin University of Science and Technology -School of Industrial Fisheries. Prof. Kurup also served as technical adviser to the Minister for Fisheries, Government of Kerala during 2006 - 2011 in the rank of Government Secretary.
Tor remadevii, the orange-finned mahseer, a critically endangered species of freshwater fish endemic to the Western Ghats of India was identified and named by Prof. B. Madhusoodhana Kurup and his student K. V. Radhakrishnan from the Pambar River, in 2007. Thus, allowed the species to gain finally a scientific name and contributed significantly to the conservation efforts of the species, which was under taxonomic ambiguity for many years.

Eponym 

Puntius madhusoodani, a fish species distributed in Manimala River in Kerala, India, was named after Prof. B. Madhusoodana Kurup, honoring his contribution to the taxonomy and conservation of freshwater fishes of Kerala.

Publications

References

External links
 Web Page at the university

Living people
Indian ichthyologists
Place of birth missing (living people)
1954 births